Lovelace may refer to:

Augusta "Ada" King, Countess of Lovelace (1815–1852), English mathematician and publisher of Charles Babbage
Derived: Nvidia Ada Lovelace (microarchitecture)

Peerage
Baron Lovelace
Richard Lovelace, 1st Baron Lovelace (c. 1567–1634), English politician and soldier
John Lovelace, 2nd Baron Lovelace (1616–1670), British peer and Royal servant
John Lovelace, 3rd Baron Lovelace (c. 1640–1693), English Whig politician
John Lovelace, 4th Baron Lovelace (died 1709), Governor of both New York and New Jersey 
Earl of Lovelace
William King-Noel, 1st Earl of Lovelace (1805–1893), English noblemen and scientist
Peter King, 5th Earl of Lovelace (1951–2018), British peer

Fictional characters
Lovelace, a character in the canon world of My Little Pony
Lovelace, a character in the film Happy Feet
Lovelace, a character in the novel Clarissa by Samuel Richardson
Simon Lovelace, a character in the Bartimaeus book series by Jonathan Stroud
 The Lovelace Cartel, a drug cartel featured in the Black Lagoon manga series
 Doctor Loveless, a midget villain/antagonist character on the 1960s TV show Wild Wild West
 Captain Isabel Lovelace, a character in the podcast Wolf 359
 Eva Lovelace, a character in the 1958 film Stage Struck

Other uses
Lovelace (name)
Lovelace (crater), a crater on the far side of the Moon
Lovelace (film), a biopic about he American pornstar Linda Lovelace
Lovelace: A Rock Musical, about the life of Linda Lovelace
Lovelace Medal, British Computer Society award named after Ada Lovelace
Lovelace Respiratory Research Institute, a non-profit biomedical research organization

See also
Loveless (disambiguation)